Brandon Timinsky is an American entrepreneur and public speaker. Brandon co-founded GasNinjas, a fuel delivery startup acquired by Silicon Valley-based Exajoule. Timinsky's previous projects include a digital agency, social media marketing services, two real estate technology platforms, wearables, and an automotive focused e-commerce business.

Early life and education
Timinsky was born and raised in Miami. While a freshman in high-school at Gulliver Schools, he taught himself basic programming skills and started his first business at the age of 15, a viral third-party application on Twitter for gaining followers. Timinsky went on to study Economics at Florida International University and then continued to the University of Miami Business School for marketing, but dropped out to pursue his business endeavors.

Career 
In 2018, an old friend from university invited Timinsky to visit Pakistan. Attracted to the high rate of smartphone adoption and a sizable unbanked population, Timinsky decided to launch a neobank to disrupt local banking by targeting Pakistan's freelancer and remittances markets. About 87% of Pakistanis are excluded from the formal financial system.

In partnership with MasterCard, SadaPay is issuing physical debit cards tied to a digital wallet. Brandon is joined by senior-level Pakistani ex-bankers, and a foreign technology team which includes the former CTO of Gojek's financial services division. Retired Finance Secretary, Waqar Masood Khan, serves as SadaPay's Chairman of the Board.

Inspired by Travis Kalanick of Uber, Timinsky co-founded GasNinjas in 2015 with Barret Hammond. The business was merged with Exajoule, an energy company.

References

Living people
Businesspeople from Miami
1991 births
University of Miami Business School alumni
Florida International University alumni